Hauge is a historic village in Funen, Denmark, dated back to the Middle Ages (1397).  It lies to the north of Odense Canal and is now a part of Stige.

References

Suburbs of Odense
Populated places in Funen